Muhammad Khan (died July 1338) was a claimant to the throne of the Ilkhanate.

Ancestry 
He was born Pir Husein, a great-grandson of Möngke Temür, a son of Hulagu. His ancestry is different in certain sources - in one source he is shown as a son of Yul Qutlugh b. El-Temür b. Anbarchi b. Mengu Timur and in Mirkhwand he was a son of Qutlugh b. Amir Timur b. Anbarchi b. Mengu Timur.

Reign 
He was still a child when Jalayirid Hasan Buzurg raised him to the throne with regnal name Muhammad Khan in opposition to his 3rd cousin once removed Musa. In a battle that took place on July 26, 1336, Hasan Buzurg and Muhammad Khan defeated the forces of 'Ali Padshah and his puppet Ilkhan, Musa. Hasan Buzurg then installed his claimant in Tabriz. Jalal ad-Din Zakariyya (or Shams al-Din) and late Mahmudshah Inju's son Masudshah were appointed as his viziers while Hasan's supporters reaffirmed their positions. Chupanid Sorgan and his mother Sati Beg gained Karabakh, Hajji Taghay reaffirmed in Diyar Bakr, Hajji Tughanak acquired Baghdad, Musa's would be killer, Emir Qara Hasan granted overlordship over Oirat tribes. However Qara Hasan and Hajji Tughanak couldn't manage to subjugate them and were utterly defeated, latter being killed. Remaining Oirats regrouped under Governor of Khorasan, Shaikh Ali (son of Emir Ali Quschi) and supported Togha Temür for Ilkhanid throne. They were further aided by Ögrünch and Mahmud Esen Qutlugh and even occupied Soltaniyeh for a while. However they were eventually defeated by Jalayirid army, Ali Padshah's brother Muhammed beg and his wife Qutlugh Malik Khatun (daughter of Gaykhatu) were killed by Kurdish tribesmen, while Oirat leader Shaikh Ali was executed by Arghunshah (son of Emir Nawruz), who wanted Togha Temür to be his own puppet. Ögrünch and Mahmud Esen Qutlugh were too eliminated.

Over the next few years, Hasan Buzurg and Muhammad strengthened their hold over western Persia, but the appearance of the Chupanid Hasan Kucek interrupted their plans. Hasan Kucek claimed a Turkish slave of his father's deputy was in fact his father Timurtash and arrived from Egypt. This news caused Chupanids to split off from Jalayirids and join Hasan Kucek. The two opposing sides then met in the Ala Tagh area near Van on July 16, 1338, with both Hasan Buzurg and Muhammad Khan suffering defeat. After Hasan Buzurg fled, Muhammad Khan was captured by the Chupanids and executed.

References

1338 deaths
Il-Khan emperors
Year of birth missing
Monarchs who died as children
Medieval child monarchs
14th-century monarchs in Asia